The 1972–73 DFB-Ligapokal was the first season of the DFB Ligapokal. It began on 5 July 1972 and ended on 6 June 1973.

Group stage

Group 1

Group 2

Group 3

Group 4

Group 5

Group 6

Group 7

Group 8

Knockout stage

Bracket

Quarter-finals

|}

Semi-finals

|}

Final

References
Kicker Fußball-Almanach 1974  [Kicker Football-Almanac 1974] p. 36, Kicker
Kicker Fußball-Almanach 2001  [Kicker Football-Almanac 2001] p. 246, Kicker

External links
Kicker.de

See also
1972–73 DFB-Pokal
1972–73 Fußball-Bundesliga
1972–73 Fußball-Regionalliga

DFL-Ligapokal seasons
2